Patriarch Gregory of Alexandria may refer to:

 Patriarch Gregory I of Alexandria, Greek Patriarch of Alexandria in 1243–1263
 Patriarch Gregory II of Alexandria, Greek Patriarch of Alexandria in 1316–1354
 Patriarch Gregory III of Alexandria, Greek Patriarch of Alexandria in 1354–1366
 Patriarch Gregory IV of Alexandria, Greek Patriarch of Alexandria in 1398–1412
 Patriarch Gregory V of Alexandria, Greek Patriarch of Alexandria in 1484–1486